CAEU may refer to:

 Council of Arab Economic Unity
 Central Asian Economic Union, an organization later renamed to Organization of Central Asian Cooperation